Parliamentary elections were held in Belarus on 15 October 2000, with further rounds of voting on 29 October, 18 March and 1 April. The vast majority of successful candidates, 94 of 110, were independents. Voter turnout was reported to be 61.08% in the first round.

A total of 566 candidates contested the election, only around fifty of which were opponents of President Alexander Lukashenko. Opposition parties called for a boycott, criticising the government's control of the state media. In response, the Department of Justice stated that anyone calling for a boycott could receive a jail sentence of up to two years, and several activists were detained. Although a Russian delegation claimed the elections were free and fair, other international observers disagreed, noting concerns about the treatment of opposition candidates, a possible inflation of voter turnout and falsified and destroyed ballot papers.

Results

References

Belarus
Parliament
Parliamentary elections in Belarus
Belarus